The 2001 French Open was the second Grand Slam event of 2001 and the 105th edition of the French Open. It took place at the Stade Roland Garros in Paris, France, from late May through early June, 2001.

Seniors

Men's singles

 Gustavo Kuerten defeated  Àlex Corretja, 6–7(3–7), 7–5, 6–2, 6–0
It was Kuerten's 4th title of the year, and his 14th overall. It was his 3rd (and last) career Grand Slam title, and his 3rd French Open title.

Women's singles

 Jennifer Capriati defeated  Kim Clijsters, 1–6, 6–4, 12–10
It was Capriati's 3rd title of the year, and her 12th overall. It was her 2nd career Grand Slam title, and her 1st French Open title.

Men's doubles

 Leander Paes /  Mahesh Bhupathi defeated  Petr Pála /  Pavel Vízner, 7–6(7–5), 6–3

Women's doubles

 Virginia Ruano Pascual /  Paola Suárez defeated  Jelena Dokic /  Conchita Martínez, 6–2, 6–1

Mixed doubles

 Virginia Ruano Pascual /  Tomás Carbonell defeated  Paola Suárez /  Jaime Oncins, 7–5, 6–3

Juniors

Boys' singles
 Carlos Cuadrado defeated  Brian Dabul, 6–1, 6–0

Girls' singles
 Kaia Kanepi defeated  Svetlana Kuznetsova, 6–3, 1–6, 6–2

Boys' doubles
 Alejandro Falla /  Carlos Salamanca defeated  Markus Bayer /  Philipp Petzschner, 3–6, 7–5, 6–4

Girls' doubles
 Petra Cetkovská /  Renata Voráčová defeated  Neyssa Etienne /  Annette Kolb, 6–3, 3–6, 6–3

Notes

External links
 French Open official website

 
2001 in Paris
May 2001 sports events in France
June 2001 sports events in France